Countess Dracula is a 1971 British Hammer horror film based on some of the legends surrounding the Countess Elizabeth Báthory.

The film was produced by Alexander Paal and directed by Peter Sasdy, both Hungarian émigrés working in England. The original music score was composed by Harry Robertson. Countess Dracula was also released on a double bill with Vampire Circus.

Plot
In 17th-century Hungary, recently widowed Countess Elisabeth Nádasdy discovers that her youthful appearance and libido can be temporarily restored if she bathes in the blood of young women. She enlists her steward and lover Captain Dobi and her maid Julie to help with the kidnap and murder of several local girls, whilst beginning a new romance with a young Lieutenant named Imre Toth.

As a cover for her crimes while in her rejuvenated state, she takes the identity of her own 17-year-old daughter, Countess Ilona, whom she has Dobi hold captive in the woods by the mute money gambler. However, castle historian Fabio grows suspicious. Eventually, she kills a prostitute called Ziza, but her blood does not restore her like the others. Dobi finds Fabio, who has a book-chapter about blood sacrifices and tells Elisabeth the truth in return for being allowed to live. He reveals that only virgin blood will restore Elisabeth's youth and beauty.

Elisabeth then kills a peasant girl bought in the marketplace. Fabio tries to tell Toth the truth about her, but Dobi kills Fabio before he can do so. Dobi then exposes Elisabeth to Toth to steer him away from her. Elisabeth forces Toth into marrying her, but her daughter Ilona arrives home, having been brought by Dobi as a sacrifice, then freed by a repentant Julie who loved her as a daughter. At the wedding, Elisabeth grows old again after the priest pronounces the blessing. She tries to kill her daughter in front of the wedding attendees, but accidentally kills Toth instead. Elisabeth, Dobi and Julie are sentenced to death for their crimes and are last seen awaiting the hangman in their cell. In the final scene, the peasants curse Elisabeth as a "devil woman" and "Countess Dracula".

Countess Dracula was inspired by the infamous Hungarian Countess Elizabeth Báthory (1560–1614), a landowner and noblewoman who was accused of murdering dozens of women and girls.

Cast
 Ingrid Pitt as Countess Elisabeth Nadasdy (voice dubbed by Olive Gregg, uncredited)
 Nigel Green as Captain Dobi, the castle steward
 Sandor Elès as Lt. Imre Toth
 Maurice Denham as Grand Master Fabio, castle historian
 Patience Collier as Julie Szentes, the Nurse
 Lesley-Anne Down as Countess Ilona Nadasdy, Elisabeth's daughter
 Peter Jeffrey as Captain Balogh, chief bailiff
 Leon Lissek as Sergeant of Bailiffs
 Jessie Evans as Rosa, Teri's mother
 Andria Lawrence as Ziza, the whore at the Shepperd's Inn
 Susan Brodrick as Teri, the chambermaid
 Nike Arrighi as Fortune-telling gypsy girl
 Marianne Stone as Kitchen Maid
 Charles Farrell as The Seller
 Anne Stallybrass as Pregnant Woman
 Michael Cadman as Young Man
Ian Trigger as Clown
 Alex Greenland (uncredited) as Choir Boy
 Hülya Babuş as Dancer

Release
The film opened at the New Victoria cinema in London on 31 January 1971 before going on general release in the UK on 14 February. It opened October 1972 in the United States.

Critical reception 
Allmovie has retrospectively called the film "one of the more underrated films from the latter days of the Hammer Films dynasty." The Hammer Story: The Authorised History of Hammer Films, on the other hand, wrote that the film's "distinctly anemic blood-lettings fail to lift a rather tiresome tale of court intrigue."

New York Times film critic Howard Thompson considered it "better than most [horror movies] in a sea of trashy competition", and called Peter Sasdy's direction "smooth and pointed" with "crisp, cutting edge" dialogue, until the last act of the film where "it runs out of gas, along with the desperate old woman [Countess Elizabeth]." David Pirie of The Monthly Film Bulletin called the acting "extremely poor," but found that the film "frequently takes on a nightmare quality" and that Pitt "brings to the part a very potent aura of physical corruption that is especially effective in the transformation sequences."

Home media
The film is available on DVD from Metro-Goldwyn-Mayer in the US as a double-bill with The Vampire Lovers, and from Carlton in the UK in a box set with Twins of Evil and Vampire Circus.

Synapse released a Blu-ray/DVD combo pack in the U.S. in 2014, which featured a new high-definition transfer. 

In the United Kingdom, the film was released on Blu-ray by Networkonair.com, using their own high-definition transfer. The extras including a commentary with star Ingrid Pitt.

See also
 Vampire film
 Cruelty and the Beast, a concept album by Cradle of Filth on which Pitt performs narration as Báthory.

References

Sources

External links
 
 

1971 films
1971 horror films
1970s biographical films
1970s historical horror films
1970s serial killer films
20th Century Fox films
British biographical films
British historical horror films
British serial killer films
Films about kidnapping
Films about dysfunctional families
Films about infidelity
Films about virginity
Films set in castles
Films set in the 1600s
Films set in the 1610s
Films set in country houses
Films set in Hungary
Films shot at Pinewood Studios
Hammer Film Productions horror films
Cultural depictions of Elizabeth Báthory
Films directed by Peter Sasdy
1970s English-language films
1970s British films